is a former Japanese football player.

Playing career
Makita was born in Tokyo on July 11, 1968. After graduating from Tokai University, he joined NTT Kanto in 1991. He played as regular player from first season. In 1993, he moved to Urawa Reds. However he could hardly play in the match. In 1994, he moved to Japan Football League (JFL) club Fujitsu. He played as regular player in 3 seasons. In 1997, he moved to JFL club Mito HollyHock. He played as regular player in 2 seasons and he retired end of 1998 season.

Club statistics

References

External links

reds.uijin.com

1968 births
Living people
Tokai University alumni
Association football people from Tokyo
Japanese footballers
Japan Soccer League players
J1 League players
Japan Football League (1992–1998) players
Omiya Ardija players
Urawa Red Diamonds players
Kawasaki Frontale players
Mito HollyHock players
Association football defenders
Association football midfielders